Rogaland Fixed Link or simply the Rogfast is a project, constructing a sub-sea road tunnel between the municipalities of Randaberg (near the city of Stavanger) and Bokn in Rogaland county, Norway. This will be a part of the main European route E39 highway along the west coast of Norway and it will link the cities of Kristiansand – Stavanger – Haugesund – Bergen. It is currently slated for a 2033 opening.

Original plan: 2017
A  spur connection tunnel, called the Kvitsøy tunnel, going to the island municipality of Kvitsøy is included in the project.

The project was approved by the Storting (Norwegian Parliament) in May 2017, and it was planned to be finished in 2025–26.  At that time, the project was projected to cost NOK16.8 billion (about €1.73 billion), with financing set at NOK11 billion from a loan to be paid by tolls, and 6 billion directly from the government.

Construction began in January 2018, with a ceremony for the initial rock blasting for one future entrance to the tunnel.

Project halt and updated plans: 2019–2020
In October 2019, due to cost overruns predicted in budgetary updates, the project was halted, with all plans for issuing of contracts (the project was being contracted out in stages) cancelled. In December 2019, the government requested a full review and revised budget update.

The first public awareness of higher costs had occurred in July 2019, when the Norwegian Public Roads Administration announced that it had received only two bids on the contract for the spur connection tunnel to Kvitsøy, the lowest of which was NOK1 billion higher than the amount approved by the Storting in 2017. In September 2019, the Kvitsøy bidding process was closed without granting a contract. An update in November 2019 suggested that the earliest possible completion of the project would be in 2029.

By April 2020, the Norwegian Public Roads Administration's revised update estimated that the cost of the total project (including the Kvitsøy spur) had increased to NOK25 billion, an increase of NOK6.4 billion, but stated it believed there were savings of up to NOK4 billion to be found before it would submit a revised funding request to the government.

In October 2020, the Norwegian Public Roads Administration brought its revised plan to the government for consideration. Included was the intention to divide the entire project into four contracts, with the comprehensive bidding process for the first three contracts to start in 2021, for work to commence in late 2021 and early 2022. These three contracts will cover: the Kvitsøy tunnel segment; the long tunnel segment building north from Randaberg; and the long tunnel segment building south from Bokn. The fourth contract, completing the interchange tunnels connecting the Kvitsøy tunnel to the other two, will go to bidding when the Kvitsøy tunnel is completed.  The interconnection, allowing the Rogfast to open, is now forecast to be completed in 2031.

In late November 2020, the Norwegian Public Roads Administration received new approval from the government for a revised budget of NOK24.8 billion (€2.55 billion) (contrary to the April 2020 "hope" of reducing it to NOK21 billion), an increase of roughly NOK8 billion from the budget approved in 2017. The government agreed to increase its direct contribution to NOK9.9 billion, with the remaining NOK14.9 billion to be financed by borrowing that would be repaid by tolls charged to vehicles using the Rogfast; this constituted matching NOK3.9 billion increases on both the government contribution and the toll-based loan.

As of March 2022 the estimated opening date has further been delayed to 2033, with more recent delays due to gaining successful contractor bids.

Name
The name Rogfast is an abbreviation for the Norwegian name  which is translated to English as the "Rogaland fixed link". Boknafjord tunnel refers to the Boknafjord and Kvitsøy tunnel to the Kvitsøy island.

See also
 List of longest tunnels

References

External links
 Statens Vegvesen – E39 Rogfast 

Proposed tunnels in Norway
Subsea tunnels in Norway
European route E39 in Norway
Bokn
Kvitsøy
Randaberg
Proposed road tunnels in Europe